Huddersfield Giants are an English professional rugby league club based in Huddersfield, West Yorkshire. Formed in 1864, the club has competed in the sport since the foundation of the Northern Union in 1895. This list details the club's achievements in all major competitions.

Seasons

Pre-Super League era

Super League era

Notes

Bibliography
 
 

 
Huddersfield Giants
British rugby league lists